Walpole Highway is a village and civil parish in the English county of Norfolk.
For the purposes of local government, it falls within the district of King's Lynn and West Norfolk.

The village lies to the south of the route of the A47 between Peterborough and King's Lynn.

History 
A Village school was erected in 1879.

Notable People 
 James W Taylor (b1912), author and poet.

Notes

External links

Villages in Norfolk
King's Lynn and West Norfolk
Civil parishes in Norfolk